The Battle of Ghazni was fought in 1151 between the Ghurid army of Ala al-Din Husayn and the army of the Ghaznavid Sultan Bahram-Shah of Ghazna. The Ghurid ruler defeated Bahram-Shah, captured the city, and destroyed it as revenge for the execution of his brother Quṭb ud-Dīn in 1149.

Notes

References 

Ghazni 1151
Ghazni 1151
History of Ghazni Province
Ghazni 1151
1151 in Asia